Riverview Cemetery is a historic cemetery on North Market Street in Wilmington, Delaware.  The cemetery consists of two sections, on either side of North Market Street.  The southern section consists of a long, roughly rectangular plot that was purchased in 1872, when the cemetery was founded.  The landscaping of this area was designed by Herman J. Schwarzmann, and is the only known example of his work in the state.  In 1899 the cemetery's size was doubled by the acquisition of a trapezoidal parcel on the north side of North Market Street.  This section was laid out by the cemetery's superintendent, Goldsmith C. Nailor.  The northern section is the location of the state's first community mausoleum, a Classical Revival structure built in 1917 to a pattern design by the American Mausoleum Company of Clyde, Ohio.  The cemetery was founded and established by a consortium of Wilmington fraternal and social organizations as the Riverview Cemetery Company.  Today, it is owned and operated by the Friends of Historic Riverview Cemetery.

The cemetery was added to the National Register of Historic Places in 2012.

Notable burials
 Richard McMullen (1868–1944), Delaware Governor
 John Shilling (1832–1884), American Civil War Medal of Honor recipient
 George Lovington "Sassafrass" Winter (1878–1951), MLB pitcher

See also
 National Register of Historic Places listings in Wilmington, Delaware

References

External links
 Cemetery web site
 
 

Wilmington, Delaware
Cemeteries in Delaware
Cemeteries on the National Register of Historic Places in Delaware
Historic districts on the National Register of Historic Places in Delaware
National Register of Historic Places in Wilmington, Delaware